JS Tōryū (SS-512) is the twelfth boat of Sōryū-class submarines. She was commissioned on 24 March 2021.

Construction and career
Tōryū was laid down on January 27, 2017, at Kawasaki Heavy Industries Kobe Works as the 2016 plan 2900 ton type submarine No. 8127 based on the medium-term defense capability development plan (23 medium-term defense), and launched November 6, 2019. The naming and launching ceremony was held on that day.

Tōryū is the second submarine in class to follow the lead of the Ōryū. Both bear the distinction of being the first and second submarines launched with Lithium-ion batteries, which replaced the AIP Stirling engine system used in the other boats of the Sōryū-class submarines.

Gallery

Citations

References
『世界の艦船 増刊第66集 海上自衛隊全艦艇史』（海人社、2004年

External links

2019 ships
Sōryū-class submarines
Ships built by Kawasaki Heavy Industries